The New Chaucer Society is a professional academic organization dedicated to the study of Geoffrey Chaucer and the Middle Ages, founded  in 1979.  Its predecessor, the original Chaucer Society, had been founded by Frederick James Furnivall in 1868 and had closed in 1912. It is now based at the University of Miami in Coral Gables, FL.

The Society's annual journal, Studies in the Age of Chaucer, is the most distinguished journal in the field of Chaucer studies. The Society also organizes a biennial international congress and supports the Chaucer Bibliography Online.  It is one of the only organizations of its kind that actively recruits high school teachers as well as college and university professors and graduate students.

References

External links
Society webpage
Chaucer Bibliography Online

Academic organizations based in the United States
Organizations established in 1979